Our Living Stone Age is a 1963 book by Ion Idriess about Australia aboriginals.

Our Stone Age Mystery

Our Stone Age Mystery is a 1964 sequel to Our Living Stone Age.

References

1963 non-fiction books
Books by Ion Idriess
Australian non-fiction books
Books about Indigenous Australians
Angus & Robertson books